Sean Andrew Robinson (born 8 February 1991) is an English rugby union player who plays for Newcastle Falcons in the Premiership Rugby.

Robinson was educated at King's School, Worcester and Durham University, where he read Physics.

References

External links
Newcastle Falcons Profile
ESPN Profile
Ultimate Rugby Profile

1991 births
Living people
English rugby union players
Alumni of Durham University
Durham University RFC players
People educated at King's School, Worcester
Rugby union players from Greenwich
Newcastle Falcons players
Rugby union flankers